The 2022–23 Furman Paladins men's basketball team represented Furman University in the 2022–23 NCAA Division I men's basketball season. The Paladins, led by sixth-year head coach Bob Richey, played their home games at Timmons Arena and Bon Secours Wellness Arena in Greenville, South Carolina, as members of the Southern Conference. They improved on their 12-6 SoCon record from last season and finished the regular season with a 15–3 record, to finish in first place. In the SoCon tournament, they defeated Mercer, and Western Carolina to reach the championship game. In the championship game, they defeated defending SoCon tournament champion Chattanooga to make the NCAA tournament, the first time since 1980 they accomplished this. They went on to upset Virginia in the first round of the NCAA tournament, only to lose to San Diego State in the 2nd round.

Previous season
The Paladins finished the 2021–22 season 22–12, 12–6 in SoCon play to finish in second place. They defeated Mercer, and Samford to advance to the SoCon tournament championship game. There, they lost to Chattanooga in overtime.

Roster

Schedule and results

|-
!colspan=12 style=""| Non-conference regular season

|-
!colspan=12 style=""| SoCon regular season

|-
!colspan=9 style=| SoCon tournament

|-
!colspan=12 style=}| NCAA tournament

Sources

References

Furman Paladins men's basketball seasons
Furman Paladins
Furman Paladins men's basketball
Furman Paladins men's basketball
Furman